Brian Hughes (22 November 1937 – 7 October 2018) was a Welsh professional footballer. He played U23 for Wales then joined Swansea City of the 2nd Division in July 1956. He made his professional debut in a 1–1 draw against Grimsby Town in 1958. Brian was a key asset to the team that went to the FA Cup semi final in the 1963–64 season. Brian played two years (1967 and 1968) in the fledgling North American Soccer League with the Atlanta Chiefs.

Hughes moved to Victoria, British Columbia, where he was a player coach of the London Boxing Club. He later coached the University of Victoria Vikings soccer team, winning the CIAU championships in 1975 and 1987. The 1975 team won UVic's first ever CIAU Championship. The team knocked off Dalhousie and then Concordia to claim the national title after earlier Canada West victories over Alberta and Saskatchewan.

Hughes also coached in the Canadian national team soccer system. He died in Victoria on 7 October 2018.

Career statistics

English League
7 goals in 231 games

North American Soccer League
2 goals in 60 games

Honours
Swansea City
 Welsh Cup: 1960–61
Atlanta Chiefs
 North American Soccer League: 1968

References

External links
Swansea City
NASL Atlanta Chiefs
Swansea City Guest Book
UVic Vikings Hall of Fame

1937 births
2018 deaths
Footballers from Swansea
Welsh footballers
Welsh expatriate footballers
Wales under-23 international footballers
Association football defenders
Gloucester City A.F.C. players
Swansea City A.F.C. players
National Professional Soccer League (1967) players
North American Soccer League (1968–1984) players
Expatriate soccer players in the United States
Atlanta Chiefs players
Welsh expatriate sportspeople in the United States
Welsh expatriate sportspeople in Canada